Linda Wong Hing-ping (born 5 August 1968) is a Hong Kong singer who grew up in Taiwan. She was most active in the 1990s.

One of her most well-known songs is "Don't Ask Who I Am". She is also famous for reviving songs including Karl Keaton's "I Remember".

Personal life
Wong's parents are Hong Kong actors Jimmy Wang Yu and Jeanette Lin Chui, also known as Lam Chui, Jeanette Lam Chui, Jeanette Lin, or Lin Tsui. Linda's uncle is Hong Kong actor Kenneth Tsang.

Wong graduated from the Affiliated Senior High School of National Taiwan Normal University and attended National Chengchi University, graduating with a degree in journalism, prior to her singing career. She is currently an entertainment writer for a Taiwanese newspaper.

Discography
Albums 
Cantonese
 王馨平 (June 1993)
 愛一生也不夠 (December 1993)
 理想情人 (June 1994)
 飛 (November 1994)
 馨平個性 (August 1995)
 着迷 (February 1996)
 Truly (2014)

Mandarin
 別問我是誰 (October 1993)
 一生癡戀 (1994)
 織心 (1995) 
 受害者 (1996)
 馨平氣和 (1996)
 打碎心瓶 (1999)
 馨情 (2011)

Filmography

Television shows
Below the Lion Rock (2015) as Elaine

References

1968 births
Living people
Cantopop singers
Hong Kong Buddhists
20th-century Hong Kong women singers
Hong Kong Mandopop singers
Taiwanese people of Hong Kong descent
Mezzo-sopranos